SM City Olongapo Central is a shopping mall owned and operated by SM Prime Holdings, the largest mall owner and operator in the Philippines. It is the second SM Supermall in Zambales and the second SM Supermall in Olongapo City after SM City Olongapo Downtown.

SM City Olongapo Central Complex

Mall Building 
SM City Olongapo Central anchor stores are SM Supermarket, The SM Store, SM Appliances, Ace Hardware, Banco de Oro, Chinabank, Our Home, Surplus, Uniqlo, Miniso, National Book Store, Watsons, Sports Central, Cyberzone and SM Foodcourt. It also features 6 state-of-the-art digital cinemas equipped with advanced laser projection system and high-end spectator seats with comfortable Opus chairs from world-class spectator seats manufacturer Ferco Seating.

Car Park and SMX Convention Center
Car Park Building has a three-level parking lot. The building is connected to the main mall.

SMX Convention Center Olongapo offers 5 function rooms and 7 meeting rooms, totaling 2,130 square meters of leasable space that can accommodate anything from an audience of 2,000 to an exclusive conference for 10. It is located at the fourth floor of SM City Olongapo Central commercial complex. SM City Olongapo Central has been construction at the top of parking for 5th floor beside an SMX Convention Center

Civic Center and Transportation Terminal
Multi-Modal Transportation Terminal

Marikit Park
One of the earliest parks of Olongapo, it has become famous in its time.

See also
SM City Olongapo Downtown
Harbor Point
 List of largest shopping malls
 List of shopping malls in Metro Manila
 List of shopping malls in the Philippines

References

Shopping malls in the Philippines
Shopping malls established in 2019
SM Prime
Buildings and structures in Olongapo